Street is the first studio album by Dutch rock and roll and blues group Herman Brood & His Wild Romance, and the start of a solo career for Herman Brood, who had earlier toured and recorded with Cuby and the Blizzards and made one record with the short-lived band Stud. Commercially, it was not very successful: on the Dutch album chart, it reached #30 on 28 May 1977 and stayed on the chart for 7 weeks. The record was re-released on CD in 1995 by Sony BMG/Ariola.

Track listing

Personnel
Herman Brood - piano, keyboards, vocals
Jan Akkerman - guitar
Erik de Zwaan & Rob Ten Bokum - guitar, slide guitar, harmonica, vocals
Margriet Eshuis - vocals
Sjoukje van 't Spijker - vocals
Josée van Iersel - vocals
Gerrit Veen - bass
Peter Walrecht - drums
Bertus Borgers - saxophone
Frans Mijts - trumpet
Nippy Noya - conga

Technical
Herman Brood - design
Anton Corbijn, Henk Venema, John Timmer, Philip Pelgrom - photography

References 

1977 debut albums
Herman Brood & His Wild Romance albums
Ariola Records albums